Central Congregational Church (now known as City Church International) is a historic church building at 1530 N. Carroll in Dallas, Texas.

The late Gothic Revival church building was constructed in 1920 for the Central Congregational Church congregation before it moved to another location. The building was added to the National Register of Historic Places in 1995. The building is now home to City Church International.

See also

National Register of Historic Places listings in Dallas County, Texas

References

Churches in Dallas
Churches on the National Register of Historic Places in Texas
National Register of Historic Places in Dallas
Churches completed in 1920
Gothic Revival church buildings in Texas